Koenigsmark is a 1935 British-French drama film directed by Maurice Tourneur and starring Elissa Landi, John Lodge and Pierre Fresnay.

The film is based on the novel Koenigsmark by Pierre Benoît and produced in separate French and English-language versions. It was shot at the Joinville Studios in Paris, with sets designed by the art director Lucien Aguettand. The film was known in the United States as Crimson Dynasty.

Synopsis
Aurore, a Russian-born Princess living in Paris has an arranged marriage to Grand Duke Rodolphe of a small German principality, part of the wider German Empire. Although she doesn't love her husband, she is very fond of him. When he departs to take part on an intelligence operation in Africa on the orders of the Kaiser, his wife gives him a locket as a memento of her. In his absence, the Princess battles for control of the state with her brother-in-law Frederick, particularly when news arrives from Africa that Grand Duke Rodolphe has died of disease.

A young Frenchman Raoul Vignerte is hired to act as the tutor for Frederick's young son. He gradually strikes up a friendship with the widowed Princess. Vignerte is working on research into the tragic historical romance between Sophia Dorothea and Philip Christoph von Königsmarck. While investigating he discovers a secret passage in the castle and finds a skeleton hidden there, holding the locket. It becomes clear that Frederick had his brother Rodolphe murdered before he even left the castle and the story of his dying in Africa has been faked. Discovering that his plan has been uncovered, Frederick starts a fire that destroys much of the evidence.

As the outbreak of the First World War approaches, the Princess drives Raoul to safety from arrests across the border, and then returns to confront Frederick. Faced with exposure he shoots himself, at which point the Princess abdicates, not wishing to take part in the war against Russia or France.

Cast
 Pierre Fresnay as Raoul Vignerte  
 Elissa Landi as Princess Aurore  
 John Lodge as Grand Duke Frederick  
 Antonin Artaud as Cyrus Back  
 Frank Vosper as Maj. Baron de Boise  
 Jean-Max as Le commandant de Boose  
 Allan Jeayes as Grand Duke Rodolphe  
 Romilly Lunge as Lt de Hagen  
 Jean Yonnel as Le grand-duc Rodolphe  
 Jean Debucourt as Le lieutenant de Hagen  
 Marcelle Rogez as Comtesse Mélusine  
 Georges Prieur as Le prince Tumène  
 André Dubosc as Le roi  
 Roger Puylagarde as Monsieur de Marçais  
 Clary Monthal 
 Jacques Henley
 Maurice Devienne 
 Léon Courtois 
 André Lannes
 Cecil Humphreys as De Marçaise  
 Hay Petrie as Professor 
 H.G. Stoker

See also
 Koenigsmark (1923)
 Koenigsmark (1953)

References

Bibliography
 Low, Rachael. Filmmaking in 1930s Britain. George Allen & Unwin, 1985.
 Wood, Linda. British Films, 1927-1939. British Film Institute, 1986.

External links

Koenigsmark at BFI Database

1935 films
1935 drama films
British drama films
French drama films
Films based on French novels
Films based on works by Pierre Benoit
Films set in Europe
Films set in Paris
Films set in Germany
Films set in the 1910s
French black-and-white films
British black-and-white films
English-language French films
Films shot at Joinville Studios
Films directed by Maurice Tourneur
1930s British films
1930s French films